Mateusz Machaj (born 28 June 1989 in Głogów) is a Polish professional footballer who plays as a midfielder for Chrobry Głogów.

Honours
Lech Poznań
 Polish Cup: 2009

Career

Club
In July 2011 he joined Lechia Gdańsk on a four-year contract.

References

External links
 
 

1989 births
Living people
People from Głogów
Polish footballers
Amica Wronki players
Lech Poznań players
Tur Turek players
Stilon Gorzów Wielkopolski players
Lechia Gdańsk players
Chrobry Głogów players
Śląsk Wrocław players
Jagiellonia Białystok players
Ekstraklasa players
I liga players
Sportspeople from Lower Silesian Voivodeship
Association football midfielders